Broad Creek is a tributary of the lower Susquehanna River located in Harford County, Maryland.

Broad Creek originates on the west side of Constitution Road about 500 feet south of the Pennsylvania state line. It runs generally southeast through Pylesville, Maryland for the first half, then northeast for the second half of its  to the Conowingo Reservoir portion of the Susquehanna.

It flows through just two properties in its lower five miles, that of the Baltimore Area Council, B.S.A. and then the Exelon power company.  In its three-mile course through Broad Creek Memorial Scout Reservation, it was dammed to create Lake Aaron Straus and passes close to the Late Archaic Period Broad Creek Soapstone Quarries archaeological site. Downstream from the 1948 Boy Scout dam, the creek forms a noteworthy gorge through the largest and oldest eastern hemlock grove in the state east of the Allegheny Front.   At the east edge of the reservation, about two miles from its mouth, the creek meets the headwaters of the reservoir.

Principal land uses in the watershed are agriculture and forest.

References 

 United States Geological Survey. Reston, VA. "Broad Creek." Geographic Names Information System (GNIS). Accessed 2010-08-30.

Rivers of Harford County, Maryland
Rivers of Maryland
Tributaries of the Susquehanna River